Michael John Powles is a retired diplomat of New Zealand. He served as Permanent Representative to the United Nations from 1996 to 2001 and as President of UNICEF in 1998.

Career
From 1962 to 1967 he exercised Private legal practice
In 1967 he joined Ministry of Foreign Affairs and Trade (New Zealand), Wellington.
From 1972 to 1975 he was clerk in the mission in Washington, D.C.
From 1975 to 1977 he was deputy director of the External Aid department in the Ministry of Foreign Affairs and Trade (New Zealand).
From 1977 to 1979 he was head of Australia and Americas department in the Ministry of Foreign Affairs and Trade (New Zealand).
From 1980 to 1982 he was High Commissioner in Suva with commission in Tuvalu, Kiribati and Nauru.
From 1982 to 1986 he was ambassador in Jakarta (Indonesia).
From 1986 to 1989 he was Assistant Secretary of the Ministry of Foreign Affairs and Trade (New Zealand).
From 1988 to 1989 he was Co-ord, Political, Security Affairs, department in the Ministry of Foreign Affairs and Trade (New Zealand).
From 1990 to 1993 he was ambassador in Beijing.
From 1996 to 2001 he was Permanent Representative in at the Headquarters of the United Nations in New York City.

References

1939 births
High Commissioners of New Zealand to Fiji
Ambassadors of New Zealand to Indonesia
Ambassadors of New Zealand to China
Permanent Representatives of New Zealand to the United Nations
Living people
New Zealand officials of the United Nations
Chairmen and Presidents of UNICEF